Kalyaneshwari temple at Kalyaneshwari in Asansol Sadar subdivision of Paschim Bardhaman district in the Indian state of West Bengal.

Geography
The Barakar River forms the West Bengal-Jharkhand border.

All places noted in the map alongside are linked on the full screen map.

History
Kalyaneshwari is a 500-year-old centre of Shakti worship. Legend has it that human sacrifices were offered at Kalyaneshwari in the remote past. The present temple, however, is not very old and was constructed by Sri Gurudin Prasad Pal. The temple of Goddess Kalyaneshwari is believed to fulfill the wishes of childless women.

References

Video of Temple

External links
 
includes travel information about Kalyaneshwari

Shakti temples
Hindu temples in West Bengal
Buildings and structures in Paschim Bardhaman district
Asansol
Tourist attractions in Paschim Bardhaman district